Another Hostile Takeover is the seventh studio album by the Finnish rock band Hanoi Rocks, released in 2005. This was the second album, of the "reborn" Hanoi Rocks of the new millennium. When it was released, critics praised the album, but fan reactions were mixed.

Track listing

Personnel
Hanoi Rocks
Michael Monroe – lead vocals, harmonica, saxophone, guitars, keyboards, bass, castanet, percussion, Jew's harp, drums
Andy McCoy – lead, rhythm, acoustic and 12-string guitars, backing vocals, bouzouki, mandolin, clavinet
Conny Bloom – lead and rhythm guitars, backing vocals
Andy Christell – bass, backing vocals
Lacu – drums, percussion
Additional musician
 Eepo Mänty-Sorvari – drums on #15

Chart positions

Album

References

Hanoi Rocks albums
2005 albums